Gözce is a village in Bozyazı district of Mersin Province, Turkey. The state highway  is at the south of the village. The population of the village was 840. as of 2012.

References

Villages in Bozyazı District
Populated coastal places in Turkey